Kerfu Kola (also Romanized as Kerfū Kolā; also known as Kerfā Kolā) is a village in Karipey Rural District, Lalehabad District, Babol County, Mazandaran Province, Iran. At the 2006 census, its population was 338, in 80 families.

References 

Populated places in Babol County